The Arnhem–Veenendaal Classic (known as Veenendaal–Veenendaal from 1985 until 2006 and The Dutch Food Valley Classic from 2007 until 2013) is a semi classic professional road cycling race in the Netherlands starting and finishing in the town of Veenendaal. The event is part of the UCI Europe Tour calendar of events with a ranking of 1.1.

Route
The race has a course on winding roads through the two Veluwe national parks, Hoge Veluwe National Park and Veluwezoom National Park, and the Nederrijn river valley in the south east corner of Utrecht province over a distance of roughly 209 km, interspersed with little steep cobbled climbs, the most significant of which are the Grebbeberg and the Posbank in Rhenen, and the Emma Pyramid in Rozendaal. Although the city of Arnhem is featured in the title of the race, it both starts and finishes in the town of Veenendaal, but goes to and from Arnhem during the race. It also passes close to Wageningen, the centre of the Food Valley, which formerly sponsored the name of the race.

History
The race was created in 1985 by the Royal Dutch Cycling Union who wanted to create a preparation race in August just before the World Championships. Between 1985 and 2006 the race was known as Veenendaal–Veenendaal. Over the years it has been run at three different times on the international cycling calendar. In 1994 the event was moved to mid-April and given a date on a Thursday, the day after La Flèche Wallonne and a few days before Liège–Bastogne–Liège. The race organisers were never happy with this because it reduced the quality of the field with the top teams unwilling to race three times in four days, however in 2004 the UCI agreed to a date change to a less intense week on the Friday after Paris–Roubaix and two days before the biggest one-day race in the Netherlands, the Amstel Gold Race. However the event was moved to yet another new date in 2006, with the race taking place in June, away from the congested spring classics calendar and no longer competing in the same midweek with the Scheldeprijs. For the 2010 season, another date change is scheduled: the race will move to mid-August.

In 2005 Veenendaal–Veenendaal benefited from the creation of the new UCI ProTour structure when it was elevated to 1.HC standard bringing to the same level as Belgium's Omloop "Het Volk" and Germany's Rund um den Henninger Turm, thus bringing more sponsorship and publicity. In 2001 the race looked like being cancelled as the Foot and Mouth outbreak hit the Netherlands but the race eventually went ahead as the organisers modified the route to avoid sensitive areas. The 2007 race brought on board the Dutch organisation Food Valley as main sponsors and the event had the alternative title of The Dutch Food Valley Classic. Until 2008, the race always started in Veenendaal, but in 2009 the race started in Barneveld. From 2014 onwards, the race became known in Dutch as the Arnhem–Veenendaal Classic, reflecting a new start location in Arnhem.

Women's Race
In 2018, a women's race was added to the programme. The race was classified as a 1.1 UCI race and won by Annemiek van Vleuten. However, in 2019 the women's race was removed from the programme again with the organisers citing a lack of availability of police support for the race.

Results

Men's race

List of winners:

Women's race

References

External links

Cycle races in the Netherlands
UCI Europe Tour races
Recurring sporting events established in 1985
1985 establishments in the Netherlands
Cycling in Utrecht (province)
Cycling in Gelderland
Cycling in Arnhem
Sport in Veenendaal